Carol A. Mutter (born December 17, 1945) is a retired United States Marine Corps lieutenant general. She is one of the first women in the history of the United States Armed Forces to be appointed to a three-star grade, the first in the Marine Corps. She retired from the Marine Corps on January 1, 1999. Her last active duty assignment was as Deputy Chief of Staff, Manpower and Reserve Affairs (DC/S, M&RA) at Marine Corps Headquarters in Washington, D.C.

Early life and education
Mutter was born on December 17, 1945, in Greeley, Colorado. She graduated from Eaton High School in 1963. In June 1967, she was commissioned a second lieutenant in the United States Marine Corps upon graduation from Colorado State College. In addition to holding a Bachelor of Arts degree in Mathematics Education and an honorary doctorate from the University of Northern Colorado, Mutter has a Master of Arts degree in National Security and Strategic Studies from the Naval War College at Newport, Rhode Island and both a Master of Science in Business and an honorary doctorate degree from Salve Regina University, also in Newport.

Military career

After completing the Woman Officer Basic Course in 1967 at Marine Corps Base Quantico, Mutter was assigned to data processing installations at Quantico, Virginia and at Camp Pendleton, California. In 1971, she returned to Quantico as a platoon commander and instructor for women officer candidates and basic course lieutenants; she departed this tour as a captain.

During 1973–1984, Mutter progressed to the rank of lieutenant colonel while serving as Project Officer for Marine Air Command and Control Systems at Marine Corps Tactical Systems Support Activity at Camp Pendleton, California; Financial Management Officer at the Development Center, Quantico, Virginia; Assistant Chief of Staff, Comptroller, 1st Marine Aircraft Wing, Okinawa, Japan; and Deputy Comptroller at Headquarters, Fleet Marine Force, Atlantic in Norfolk, Virginia. In 1985, capitalizing on her expertise in both data processing and financial management, she was assigned as the Deputy Program Manager, and subsequently Program Manager, for the development of new Marine Corps automated pay and personnel systems for active duty, retired, and reserve Marines.

In July 1988, as a colonel, Mutter joined the United States Space Command, J-3 (Operations) Directorate in Colorado Springs becoming the first woman to gain qualification as a Space Director. After initially serving as a Command Center Crew Commander/Space Director she became the Division Chief responsible for the operation of the Space Command Commander in Chief's Command Center.

August 1990 brought a transfer to III Marine Expeditionary Force (MEF) on Okinawa, Japan and duty as the Assistant Chief of Staff, Comptroller for both III MEF and 3rd Marine Division. In June 1991, Mutter returned to Quantico as a brigadier general to serve as the Deputy Commanding General, Marine Corps Systems Command and Program Manager for Command and Control Systems. In June 1992, she again transferred to Okinawa, this time as the first woman of general/flag officer rank to command a major deployable tactical command, the 3d Force Service Support Group, III MEF, United States Marine Forces Pacific. In June 1994, she became the first woman in the Marine Corps to be promoted to the rank of major general and served as Commander, Marine Corps Systems Command at Marine Corps Base Quantico until August 1996. On September 1, 1996, Mutter was promoted to lieutenant general and assumed the duties as Deputy Chief of Staff for Manpower and Reserve Affairs (DC/S M&RA). Lieutenant General Mutter retired in 1999.

Mutter also attended the Amphibious Warfare School and the Marine Corps Command and Staff College, both at Quantico, Virginia.

Personal life
Mutter is the daughter of Albert B. "Bert" Schneider (1918–1973) and Hedwig W. "Haddie" (Spaedt) Schneider (1919–2013).

Mutter married her first husband, United States Marine Corps Second Lieutenant Gerrit L. Wiescamp (1938–1977) in June 1967. They divorced in March 1975.

Mutter married her second husband, Marine Corps Major James M. Mutter on 7 May 1977. James Mutter retired from the Marine Corps in July 1993 as a colonel. They reside in Indianapolis, Indiana.

During the George W. Bush Administration, Carol Mutter was a member of the American Battle Monuments Commission and chair of the Defense Department Advisory Committee on Women in the Services. In 2008, she spoke at the Republican National Committee.

Awards and decorations
 

In 2004, she was inducted into the Colorado Women's Hall of Fame. In 2017, she was inducted into the National Women's Hall of Fame.

Firsts
First woman to qualify as Command Center Crew Commander/Space Director at U.S. Space Command.
First woman of flag rank to command a major deployable tactical command.
First female Marine major general, and senior woman in all the services at that time.
First woman nominated by the U.S. President for three-star rank.
First female lieutenant general in the U.S. Armed Forces.

See also
 List of female United States military generals and flag officers

References

Further reading

LtGen Mutter's Statement concerning Personnel before the Senate Armed Services Committee, March 18, 1998.  Accessed March 29, 2006
Rhem, Kathleen T. "Military Undergoing 'Evolutionary Change' for Women in Service", American Forces Press Service,  January 2005.  Accessed March 29, 2006
"Introducing the 2017 NWHF Inductees"  National Women's Hall of Fame.  Retrieved 2017-09-20.  https://www.womenofthehall.org/introducing-2017-nwhf-inductees/

1945 births
Living people
People from Greeley, Colorado
University of Northern Colorado alumni
Salve Regina University alumni
Naval War College alumni
Recipients of the Defense Superior Service Medal
Recipients of the Navy Distinguished Service Medal
Female generals of the United States Marine Corps
21st-century American women
Military personnel from Colorado